Samuel Smith (14 April 1754 – 12 March 1834) was a British Tory Member of Parliament and banker.

Biography
Samuel Smith the fourth son of Abel Smith, a wealthy Nottingham banker and Member of Parliament. Four of his brothers were also Members of Parliament and one, Robert, was raised to the peerage as Baron Carrington. A portion of the family wealth was devoted to buying control of two pocket boroughs, Wendover and Midhurst, and Carrington kept the seats here almost exclusively for use by various members of the Smith family until his power was ended by the Great Reform Act.

Smith entered Parliament in 1788 as member for St Germans, and was an MP for the next 44 years, also representing Leicester (1790–1818), Midhurst (1818–1820) and Wendover (1820–1832). He and his son Abel were Wendover's last MPs, as they sat together as its members for the last two years before the borough's abolition. In 1826, being the longest continually-serving MP, he became Father of the House. He did not return to Parliament after the 1832 Great Reform Act, dying two years later.

In 1801 Smith bought Woodhall Park in Hertfordshire, which still belongs to his descendants.

Family
Smith married Elizabeth Turnor on 2 December 1783. They had seven daughters and four sons. As well as his son Abel, his grandson Samuel George Smith was a Member of Parliament.

Several of his children married into the family of the Earl of Leven. The eldest son, Abel Smith, married Lady Marianne Leslie-Melville, youngest daughter of Alexander Leslie-Melville, 9th Earl of Leven, on 28 August 1822. The third son, Henry Smith, married Lady Lucy Leslie-Melville, eldest daughter of the 9th Earl of Leven, on 14 July 1824. The youngest daughter, Charlotte Smith, married the Hon. Alexander Leslie-Melville, fifth son of the 9th Earl of Leven, on 19 October 1825. In addition, his grandson Henry Abel Smith (1826–1890), son of Henry Smith and Lady Lucy Leslie-Melville, married his first cousin Elizabeth Mary Pym, daughter of Francis Pym and Lady Jane Elizabeth Leslie-Melville, second daughter of the 9th Earl of Leven, on 30 October 1849; they were the grandparents of Sir Henry Abel Smith who served as Governor of Queensland.

References

External links 
 

|-

1754 births
1834 deaths
Members of the Parliament of Great Britain for English constituencies
British MPs 1784–1790
British MPs 1790–1796
British MPs 1796–1800
Members of the Parliament of the United Kingdom for English constituencies
UK MPs 1801–1802
UK MPs 1802–1806
UK MPs 1806–1807
UK MPs 1807–1812
UK MPs 1812–1818
UK MPs 1818–1820
UK MPs 1820–1826
UK MPs 1826–1830
UK MPs 1830–1831
UK MPs 1831–1832
Members of the Parliament of Great Britain for constituencies in Cornwall
Samuel